Bidens tenuisecta , the slim lobe beggarticks, is a North American species of flowering plant in the family Asteraceae. It is native to northern Mexico (Chihuahua) and the western United States (Arizona, New Mexico, Colorado and Utah, with a few isolated populations in Texas and Idaho). There are also reports of populations in the northeastern United States (Massachusetts, New York, Maryland) but these are almost assuredly introductions.

Bidens tenuisecta  is an annual herb up to 120 cm (4 feet) tall. It produces up to three yellow flower heads per branch, each had containing both disc florets and ray florets. The Plant grows in meadows and along mountain streams.

References

External links
iNaturalist: Aceitilla (Bidens tenuisecta) 
Go Botany, New England Wildflower Society (introduced)

tenuisecta
Flora of Northwestern Mexico
Flora of the Southwestern United States
Flora of the South-Central United States
Plants described in 1849
Taxa named by Asa Gray